Proteodes melographa is a species of moth in the family Depressariidae. It is endemic to New Zealand and has been observed at Mount Arthur and in the Nelson District. It inhabits forest in the alpine zone. The larvae of this species feeds on native beech trees.

Taxonomy
This species was first described by Edward Meyrick in 1927 using a specimen collected at Mount Arthur at 4000 ft in January by Selwyn Woodward. In 1936 Meyrick synonymised Proteodes varia with P. melographa. The male holotype specimen is held in the Natural History Museum, London.

Description 

Meyrick described this species as follows:

Distribution
This species is endemic to New Zealand and is found in the Nelson/Tasman districts.

Behaviour 
This species is on the wing in January.

Habitat and host species
The species can be found in alpine habitats at the limit of forest growth. The larvae of this moth feeds on native beech trees.

References

Moths described in 1927
Moths of New Zealand
Depressariidae
Endemic fauna of New Zealand
Taxa named by Edward Meyrick
Endemic moths of New Zealand